DuBois Regional Airport , formerly DuBois–Jefferson County Airport, is in Jefferson County, Pennsylvania, eight miles northwest of DuBois, a city in Clearfield County. The airport is in Washington Township. It is owned and operated by the Clearfield-Jefferson Counties Regional Airport Authority, based at the airport. It has scheduled service on one airline, Southern Airways Express, subsidized by the Essential Air Service program.

The National Plan of Integrated Airport Systems for 2021–2025 categorized it as a non-primary commercial service airport. DuBois Regional is a refueling stop for many aircraft due to its proximity to Interstate 80 and several air routes, as well as its on-field restaurant.

History
In the early 1950s the City of DuBois created a Municipal Airport Authority which looked into expanding DuBois City Airport, in the Oklahoma section east of the city. The first flight was made on June 1, 1960 by Allegheny Airlines (Allegheny Commuter replaced Allegheny in 1969). The runway was 4700 feet; in the 1960s and 1970s radio navigational aids were added, including a non-directional beacon, and finally an Instrument Landing System (ILS) for runway 25.

Brockway Glass Corporation, headquartered in nearby Brockway, built a hangar for their aircraft (and later a commuter airline service), and Fixed-Base Operator Beechwoods Flying Service built general aviation "T hangars", fuel pumps and maintenance hangars. The FAA opened a Flight Service Station in 1963 to provide weather and advisory service to pilots; the area is noted for rapidly changing and severe weather. In the 1970s the FAA built a regional radio navigational maintenance facility on the field.

In 1988 Brockway Glass was taken over by Owens-Illinois and its assets were liquidated, including the Crown Airways commuter airline. The Flight Service Station closed in 1990 during FSS consolidation, and its functions were assumed by the Altoona FSS.

Since 1991 the airport complex has continued to expand and renovate facilities. It was designated a Foreign Trade Zone in 2001. A better access road, part of Pennsylvania Route 830, was completed in 2007.

Facilities
The airport covers 399 acres (161 ha) at an elevation of 1,817 feet (554 m) above sea level. Its single runway, 7/25, is 5,503 by 100 feet (1,677 x 30 m).

In the year ending April 19, 2021, the airport had 6,539 aircraft operations, an average of 18 per day: 67% air taxi, 32% general aviation and less than 1% military. In April 2022, there were 10 aircraft based at this airport: 9 single-engine and 1 multi-engine.

Airline and destinations 

Scheduled passenger service:

Statistics

Incidents

References

Other sources 

 Essential Air Service documents (Docket OST-2004-17617) from the U.S. Department of Transportation:
 Order 2004-8-18 (August 16, 2004): selecting Mesa Air Group, Inc. subsidiary, Air Midwest, Inc., d/b/a US Airways Express, to provide essential air service (EAS) at DuBois, Pennsylvania, for the period from July 23, 2004, through August 31, 2006, at an annual subsidy rate of $643,818.
 Order 2006-6-31 (June 26, 2006): re-selecting Mesa Air Group, Inc. d/b/a Air Midwest, to provide essential air service (EAS) at DuBois, Pennsylvania, for the two-year period beginning August 1, 2006, at an annual subsidy rate of $599,271.
 Order 2007-7-21 (July 26, 2007): selecting Gulfstream International Airlines, Inc. to provide subsidized essential air service (EAS) at DuBois and Franklin/Oil City, Pennsylvania, Greenbrier/White Sulphur Springs/Lewisburg, West Virginia, and Athens, Georgia, at a total annual subsidy rate of $4,077,792 ($1,159,229 for DuBois, $763,741 for Franklin/Oil City, $1,329,477 for Greenbrier/White Sulphur Springs/Lewisburg, and $825,345 for Athens) for the two-year period beginning when Gulfstream inaugurates service through the end of the 24th month thereafter.
 Order 2008-5-3 (May 6, 2008): selecting Gulfstream International Airlines, Inc. to provide subsidized essential air service (EAS) at DuBois and Franklin/Oil City, Pennsylvania, and Greenbrier/White Sulphur Springs/Lewisburg (Lewisburg), West Virginia, at a total annual subsidy rate of $5,577,594 ($2,020,095 for DuBois, $1,226,773 for Franklin/Oil City, and $2,330,725 for Lewisburg) for the two-year period beginning when Gulfstream inaugurates service through the end of the 24th month thereafter.
 Order 2010-9-12 (September 9, 2010): re-selecting Gulfstream International Airlines to provide essential air service (EAS) at Bradford, DuBois, and Oil City/Franklin, Pennsylvania, and Jamestown, New York, for a combined annual subsidy of $5,870,657 ($1,087,306 for Bradford, $2,228,996 for DuBois, $915,101 for Oil City/Franklin, and $1,639,254 for Jamestown), from October 1, 2010, through September 30, 2012.
 Order 2012-9-23 (September 27, 2012): selecting Silver Airways to provide Essential Air Service (EAS) at Bradford, DuBois, Franklin/Oil City, Pennsylvania, Jamestown, New York, and Parkersburg, West Virginia/Marietta, Ohio, for a combined annual subsidy of $10,348,117 ($1,940,272 for Bradford; $2,587,029 for DuBois, $1,293,515 for Franklin, $1,940,272 for Jamestown, and $2,587,029 for Parkersburg), from October 1, 2012, through September 30, 2014.
 Notice of Intent (February 14, 2014): of Silver Airways Corp. to discontinue scheduled air service between Cleveland, Ohio (CLE) and: Jamestown, New York (JHW), Bradford, Pennsylvania (BFD), DuBois, Pennsylvania (DUJ), Franklin/Oil City, Pennsylvania (FKL), and Parkersburg, West Virginia/Marietta, Ohio (PKB).

External links 

 Official website for DuBois Regional Airport
 DuBois Regional Airport at Pennsylvania DOT Bureau of Aviation
 Aerial image as of April 1994 from USGS The National Map
 

Airports in Pennsylvania
County airports in Pennsylvania
Essential Air Service
Transportation buildings and structures in Jefferson County, Pennsylvania